= Ranieri Filo della Torre literary prize =

Ranieri Filo della Torre (or Premio letterario internazionale Ranieri Filo della Torre) is an international literary prize for writing about extra virgin olive oil. It is sponsored by the Italian association of women professionals in the olive oil sector, Pandolea Association. It is open to authors of poems, short stories and scientific papers on the subject of extra virgin olive oil. The first award was in 2017.

== Winners ==
=== 2019 ===
Source:

=== 2020 ===
- Science: Doctoral thesis: Elisa Pannucci, "Novel applications of plant-derived polyphenolic compounds"
- Master's thesis: Giulia Vicario, "Near UV-Vis and NMR spectroscopic analysis of Tuscan extra-virgin olive oils"
- Bachelor's thesis:
  - Maddalena Lo Gatto, "Qualitative/quantitative analysis of Hydroxytyrosol Oleate in oil matrices"
  - Irene Raggi, "Rapid evaluation of extra virgin olive oil using PTR-ToF-MS technology: the case of the municipality of Calenzano"
- Poetry: Bruno Fiorentini, L’Olivo (The olive tree)
- Fiction: Antonio Moresi, Olio e vita (Oil and life)
